Schistura paucicincta is a species of ray-finned fish, a stone loach, in the genus Schistura. It is only known from the Mae Nam Noi drainage, a tributary of the Salween River which forms the border between Thailand and Myanmar. This species inhabits streams with a moderate to fast current, in riffles, over beds varying from gravel to stone but it has also been recorded in small forest streams in very shallow water.

References

P
Fish described in 1990